The 2018 Colorado Rapids season will be the Colorado Rapids' 23rd season of existence, their 23rd season in Major League Soccer and their 23rd season in the top-tier of American soccer.

Due to a reconfiguration in the CONCACAF Champions League format, the Rapids will begin play in the Champions League this year for their successes during the 2016 season. Colorado opens their slate of competitive fixtures on February 20 in the Champions League Round of 16 with a two-legged series against Canadian champions, Toronto FC in the round of 16. On March 3, the club will have their MLS opener against Chicago Fire. In either May or June, the Rapids will begin play in the U.S. Open Cup.

Background 

The 2017 season saw a sharp downturn in the Rapids fortunes. Colorado finished the 2017 season second-bottom of the Western Conference table, with the third-worst overall record in Major League Soccer. Colorado finished 10th in the Western Conference and 20th in the overall table. The team scored a league-low 31 goals in 34 matches and conceded 51 goals. Dominique Badji lead the team with 7 goals across all competitions.

Outside of MLS play, the Rapids played in the 2017 edition of the U.S. Open Cup, where they lost in the fifth round to FC Dallas. The Rapids failed to qualify for the 2017 MLS Cup Playoffs. At the end of the campaign, four-year head coach, Pablo Mastroeni was relieved of his duties.

Review

Club

Roster

Team management

Transfers

In

Draft picks 
Draft picks are not automatically signed to the team roster.

Out

Loan in

Loan out

Competitions

Friendlies

Major League Soccer

U.S. Open Cup

CONCACAF Champions League

Round of 16

Statistics

Top scorers

As of 28 October 2018.

Awards and honors

References 

Colorado Rapids seasons
Colorado Rapids
Colorado Rapids
Colorado Rapids
Colorado